Various polling organisations have been conducting opinion polling in specific ridings in the lead up to the 2011 Canadian general election. The results of publicised opinion polling for individual constituencies are detailed in this article.

Opinion polls have been conducted from the months following the previous general election held in October 2008, and have increased in frequency leading up to the general election.

Given the expense of polling individual constituencies, constituencies are usually only polled if they are of some particular interest, e.g. they are thought to be marginal or facing an impending by-election. The constituencies polled are not necessarily representative of a national average swing. Under the first-past-the-post electoral system the true marginal seats, by definition, will be decisive as to the outcome of the election.

A total of 20 polls in 17 ridings across 2 provinces was conducted.

Constituency polls

British Columbia

Saanich—Gulf Islands

Quebec

Beauport—Limoilou

Charlesbourg—Haute-Saint-Charles

Chicoutimi—Le Fjord

Gaspésie—Les Îles-de-la-Madeleine

Haute-Gaspésie—La Mitis—Matane—Matapédia

Hull—Aylmer

Jonquière—Alma

Lévis—Bellechasse

Lotbinière—Chutes-de-la-Chaudière

Louis-Hébert

Louis-Saint-Laurent

Portneuf—Jacques-Cartier

Québec

Richmond—Arthabaska

Roberval—Lac-Saint-Jean

Trois-Rivières

See also
Opinion polling in the Canadian federal election, 2011

Notes
Notes
 In cases when linked poll details distinguish between the margin of error associated with the total sample of respondents (including undecided and non-voters) and that of the subsample of decided/leaning voters, the latter is included in the table.  Also not included is the margin of error created by rounding to the nearest whole number or any margin of error from methodological sources. Most online polls—because of their opt-in method of recruiting panellists which results in a non-random sample—cannot have a margin of error. In such cases, shown is what the margin of error would be for a survey using a random probability-based sample of equivalent size.
 Refers to the total sample size, including undecided and non-voters.
 "Telephone" refers to traditional telephone polls conducted by live interviewers; "IVR" refers to automated Interactive Voice Response polls conducted by telephone; "online" refers to polls conducted exclusively over the internet; "telephone/online" refers to polls which combine results from both telephone and online surveys, or for which respondents are initially recruited by telephone and then asked to complete an online survey.

References

2011
2011 Canadian federal election
Canada